The Malta cricket team toured Belgium in June 2022 to play three Twenty20 International (T20I) matches. The series provided both sides with preparation for the  2022 ICC Men's T20 World Cup Europe sub-regional qualifier tournaments.

The hosts were on top from the start with an opening partnership of 135 runs in the first game, and they went on to win all three games convincingly.

Squads

T20I series

1st T20I

2nd T20I

3rd T20I

References

External links
 Series home at ESPN Cricinfo

Associate international cricket competitions in 2022